Bruno Campos  is a Brazilian-American lawyer and former actor, best known for his roles of Dr. Quentin Costa on the award-winning television show Nip/Tuck, the voice of Prince Naveen in the animated film The Princess and the Frog, and Massimo in the Academy Award-nominated Brazilian movie O Quatrilho. In 2010, Campos attended law school, earning a J.D. in 2013, and works for the firm Covington & Burling.

Early life
Originally from Brazil, Campos spent parts of his childhood in Canada, Bahrain, and the United States. At age 17, he attended Michigan's Interlochen Arts Academy. He then studied drama at Northwestern University (north of Chicago in Evanston, Illinois) graduating with a bachelor's degree in 1995.

Career
In 1995, he starred in the Brazilian film O Quatrilho which was nominated for Best Foreign Language Film at the Academy Awards. That same year, he played the male lead at The Goodman Theatre in All's Well That Ends Well, directed by Tony Award winner Mary Zimmerman.

From there, he became better known to American audiences for his roles as Diego on the NBC sitcom Jesse, starring Christina Applegate; as attorney Joe Rivera in the Showtime series Leap Years; and for a recurring guest role as Dr. Eddie Dorset on ER. In 2004, he joined the cast of Nip/Tuck playing plastic surgeon Quentin Costa.

In 2010, he made a guest appearance in Private Practice. In Season 3 Episode 15, he played the brief boyfriend of Charlotte King, and is accused of abusing OxyContin. Campos also had a recurring role, during the first season of Royal Pains, as Charlie Casey, the ex-husband of one of the lead characters, Jill Casey.

He voiced the character of Prince Naveen in the Disney film, The Princess and the Frog, which was released in 2009 and went on to be nominated for three Academy Awards. In 2022, it was announced that he will be reprising the role in the upcoming attraction Tiana's Bayou Adventure, which will be opening at both Disneyland and Magic Kingdom in late 2024.

Second career in law
In the early 2010s, Campos stopped doing television and film work and enrolled in law school. He received a J. D. from the University of Michigan in 2013. While in law school, he held an internship with Judge Avern Cohn of the United States District Court for the Eastern District of Michigan. After graduating he passed the bar in New York.  After passing the bar, he was an associate with the law firm Morgan, Lewis & Bockius. As of 2019 he is listed as being with the firm of Covington & Burling. According to his profile, he "represents client policyholders in a wide range of industries in complex insurance recovery matters", as well as "provid[ing] strategic guidance through the life of a claim, from claims presentation and mediation through disputes in courts and arbitrations."

Filmography

Awards and nominations

References

External links
 

Living people
Male actors from Rio de Janeiro (city)
Brazilian male film actors
Brazilian male television actors
Brazilian male voice actors
21st-century American lawyers
Brazilian emigrants to the United States
American male film actors
American male television actors
American male voice actors
Interlochen Center for the Arts alumni
University of Michigan Law School alumni
Northwestern University School of Communication alumni
Place of birth missing (living people)
Brazilian actors
1973 births